The Central District of Abadeh County is a district (bakhsh) in Abadeh County, Fars Province, Iran. At the 2006 census, its population was 87,203, in 23,387 families.  The District has five cities: Abadeh, Soghad, Bahman, Izadkhvast, and Surmaq. The District has five rural districts (dehestan): Bahman Rural District, Bidak Rural District, Izadkhvast Rural District, Khosrow Shirin Rural District, and Surmaq Rural District. Khosrow Shirin Rural District was transferred to the district from Central District of Eqlid County on 26 April 2007 due to popular demand.

References 

Abadeh County
Districts of Fars Province